Määttä is a Finnish surname. Notable people with the surname include:

Eilert Määttä (1935–2011), Swedish professional ice hockey player and coach
Pirkko Määttä (born 1959), Finnish cross-country skier
Olli Määttä (born 1994), Finnish professional ice hockey player
Tero Määttä (born 1982), Finnish ice hockey player

Finnish-language surnames